The 1994 United States House of Representatives election in Vermont was held on Tuesday, November 8, 1994 to elect the U.S. representative from the state's at-large congressional district. The election coincided with the elections of other federal and state offices, including an election to the U.S. Senate.

In the midst of the Republican Revolution, Bernie Sanders was narrowly re-elected by a margin of 3.31%. This election marks the final statewide election Sanders contested where he did not win every county in the state as well as the closest election of Sanders’ congressional career.

Republican primary

Candidates

Declared
Clint Barnum, stonemason
John Carroll, majority leader of the Vermont State Senate

Democratic primary

Liberty Union primary

General election

References

1994
Vermont
1994 Vermont elections
Bernie Sanders